Uttara Kannada is a district in the Indian state of Karnataka. It is a major coastal district of Karnataka, and is the third largest district in Karnataka. It is bordered by the state of Goa and Belagavi districts to the north, Dharwad District and Haveri District to the east, Shivamogga District, and Udupi District to the south, and the Arabian Sea to the west.

Karwar is the district headquarters, Kumta & Sirsi are the major commercial centers in the district.

The district's agroclimatic divisions include the coastal plain (consisting of Karwar, Ankola, Kumta, Honnavar and Bhatkal taluks) and Malenadu (consisting of Sirsi, Siddapur, Yellapur, Haliyal, Joida, and Mundgod taluks).

History 

The first known dynasty from Uttar Kannada District are Chutus of Banavasi. Uttara Kannada was the home of the Kadamba kingdom from the 350 to 525. They ruled from Banavasi. After the subjugation of the Kadambas by the Chalukyas, the district came under successive rule of empires like Chalukyas, Rashtrakutas, Hoysalas and Vijayanagar empire. Moroccan traveler Ibn Battuta is said to have stayed for a time in the district under the protection of Nawayath Sultan Jamal Al-Din at Hunnur. This place is presently known as Hosapattana and is located in the town of Honnavar. Ruins of an old mosque and its minaret can still be seen in the village. The district came under the rule of Maratha Empire in the 1750s and later part of Mysore Kingdom, who ceded it to the British at the conclusion of the Fourth Mysore War in 1799. It was initially part of Kanara district in Madras Presidency. The district was divided to North and South Kanara districts in 1859. The British finally transferred Uttara Kannada district to Bombay Presidency in 1862.

After India's independence in 1947, Bombay Presidency was reconstituted as Bombay State. In 1956, the southern portion of Bombay State was added to Mysore State, which was renamed Karnataka in 1972.

Significant and picturesque, the Sadashivgad fort of historical importance is now a tourist destination located by the Kali river bridge, which has been built at the confluence of the river and the Arabian Sea. The renowned Bengali poet and Nobel laureate Rabindranath Tagore, who visited Uttara Kannada in 1882, dedicated an entire chapter of his memoirs to this town. The 22-year-old Rabindranath Tagore stayed with his brother, Satyendranath Tagore, who was the district judge in Uttara Kannada. There is a substantial amount of Chardo families in this area as they had migrated due to the persecution of the Portuguese in Goa.

Portuguese

Cintacora, also known as Chittakula, and Sindpur, were Portuguese and Chittakula was known to them as a very old port. When the fort of Sadashivgad was built in this area, the village also came to be known by that name. Pir fort, named for the Dargah of Shah Karamuddin, was captured and burnt by the Portuguese in 1510. The creek at the mouth of the Kali River was a trading center which came into great prominence after Sadashivgad was built and the Portuguese realized the advantages of its sheltered harbour.

British
In 1638, a rival English trading body, the Courteen Association, established a factory at Uttara Kannada (actually the village named Kadwad, situated  eastwards on the banks of the Kali river). It was a trade port frequented by traders from Arabia and Africa. Baitkhol port (the current civil port of Uttara Kannada) was known for its natural harbour. The name Baithkhol is Arabic term, Bait-e-kol, meaning bay of safety. Muslin was the chief commodity purchased but Uttara Kannada was also a source for pepper, cardamom, cassia and coarse blue cotton cloth. Situated on India's west coast, 50 miles south-east of Goa, Uttara Kannada was noted for its safe harbour. In 1649, the Courteen Association united with the British East India Company and Uttara Kannada became a company factory.

Kingdom of Mysore
In the Treaty of Mangalore signed in 1784, between Tipu Sultan and the East India Company, one finds reference to Uttara Kannada and Sadashivgad written as Karwar and Sadasewgude respectively.

Bhatkal and Honnavar were the chief ports of Tippu Sultan in the district.

The British Empire
The British made Carwar the district headquarters of North Canara in 1862. Since 1862, the time from which it came under Bombay presidency, Uttara Kannada was described as a first rate harbour between Bombay and Colombo.

Maratha Empire
It became a part of Maratha territory. It was a part of the Bombay Presidency until 1950.

Geography and climate

The main geographic feature of the district is the Western Ghats or Sahyadri range, which runs from north to south through the district. Behind the coastal plain are flat-topped hills from 60 to 100 meters in height, and behind the hills are the ridges and peaks of the Sahyadris. East of the Sahyadris is the Balaghat upland, part of the vast Deccan plateau. East of the crest is the rain shadow of the Sahyadris, which receive as little as  annually. Much of the rain falls in the June–September monsoon. Four major rivers drain westwards from the crest of the Sahyadris to the sea; from north to south, they are the Kali, Gangawali, Aghanashini, Sharavati. These rivers form numerous waterfalls, The river Aghanashini drops 116 meters, Magod Falls, where the Bedti river plunges 180 meters in two leaps, Shivganga falls, where the river Sonda (Shalmali) drops 74 meters, and Lalguli falls and Mailmane falls on the river Kali. In the lowlands, these rivers form wide estuaries, extending several kilometers inland from the coast.

Ecology

The district's high rainfall supports lush forests, which cover approximately 70% of the district. The Malabar Coast moist forests ecoregion lies in a narrow strip between the Arabian Sea and the foothills of the Western Ghats up to 250 meters elevation. These forests have been almost completely converted to agriculture and teak plantations. The North Western Ghats moist deciduous forests cover the Sahyadris from 250 to 1000 meters elevation. Many trees shed leaves in the drier months. Above 1000 meters elevation lie the evergreen North Western Ghats montane rain forests. Dandeli Wildlife Sanctuary protects  of semi-evergreen and bamboo forest in the watershed of the Kali river and its tributaries, the Kaneri and Nagajhari. Wroughton's free-tailed bat (Otomops wroughtoni) is endemic to the forests of Bhimgad Wildlife Sanctuary.

The district is also home to patches of savanna and degraded scrub jungles, which are often the result of overuse for logging or grazing. Much of the lowland has been cleared for agriculture. Mangrove forests can be found in the river estuaries, and the sandy beaches are home to groves of Calophyllum inophyllum, coconut and screw pine (Pandanus). The rocky beaches at Binaga, Arga, Belekeri, Tadadi, Gokarna, Ankola, Kumta, Dhareshwar, Kasarkod, Murdeshwara, Bhatkal and Belke of the district are rich with marine fauna diversity. The beaches at Bhatkal include American Jali Beach, Bahrain Jali Beach, NaStar Beach, Nakhuda Beach, Lighthouse Beach and the rocky Udmudey Beach. The rocky beaches of Uttara Kannada District harbor the invertebrates belonging to the phyla Porifera, Coelenterata, Annelida, Arthropoda, Mollusca and Echinodermata.
Attiveri bird sanctuary is home to 79 species of birds including migratory birds from 22 countries.

Dandeli Wildlife Sanctuary is famous for the elusive black panther among other animals like gaur, tiger and leopards.
The Kavala caves with their . Yana is an enchanting place that can be reached by trekking about  through lush forest. There is also a shrine of Bhairaveshvara here.
Anshi National Park located some distance from Dandeli is undisturbed. There are many dams in this district namely Supa Dam, Kodasalli Dam and Kadra Dam. The atomic energy station at Kaiga is on the banks of Kali River (Karnataka).

Economy
Uttara Kannada has a Gross Domestic District Product of 530297 Lakh Crores with Karwar and Sirsi being major contributors.sirsi has the highest per capita income in the district at 54850 followed by karwar at 44326, while Bhatkal and Haliyal have the lowest.

Agriculture
The chief crops of the district are rice and areca nut, along with a great diversity of other crops. Tree crops include coconut, sugarcane, cocoa, cashew, mango, banana, pineapple, garcinia, jack fruit, and sapota; vegetables include onion, radish, cucumber, cauliflower, sweet potato, eggplant (brinjal), and amaranth; spices include pepper, cardamom, ginger and nutmeg. Millet and cotton are grown in the drier portion of the district east of the Western Ghats.

Bhatkal is known for its imported goods markets, which existed even before India's liberalisation.

Commerce and industry 

 Kaiga Atomic Power Station
 Solaris ChemTech
 INS Kadamba
 Supa Dam
 West coast paper mill

Demographics

According to the 2011 census, Uttara Kannada has a population of 1,437,169, roughly equal to the nation of Eswatini or the US state of Hawaii. This gives it a ranking of 346th in India (out of a total of 640).
Its population growth rate over the decade 2001–2011 was 6.15%. Uttara Kannada has a sex ratio of 975 females for every 1000 males. Scheduled Castes and Scheduled Tribes make up 8.10% and 2.39% of the population respectively.

Religion

The population is predominantly Hindu, although a Catholic community has existed here since the 1500s. Muslims are a sizeable minority in Bhatkal Taluk and are majority in Bhatkal City. A small community of Tibetan refugees lives in Mundgod.

Language

The main language spoken in this district is Kannada, spoken by 55.34%. Other major languages include Konkani at 18.21%, 11.83% Urdu, 9.52% Marathi and 1.36% Telugu. Marathi speakers are mostly located in Joida and Haliyal taluks in the north and Konkani is in majority in Karwar taluk, although it is spoken throughout the district in lesser numbers. Nawayathi is a Konkani dialect spoken by Nawayath Muslims in Bhatkal and surrounding areas.

Literacy
Total about 10.8 lakh people in the district are literate, among them about 5.8 lakh are male and about 5 lakh are female. Literacy rate (children under 6 are excluded) of Uttara Kannada is 84%. 90% of male and 78% of female population are literate here. Overall literacy rate in the district has increased by 7%. Male literacy has gone up by 5% and female literacy rate has gone up by 10%.

Culture

Yakshagana is a classical dance drama popular in the state of Karnataka in India mostly popular in the districts of Uttara Kannada. Shimoga, Udupi, Dakshina Kannada and Kasaragod district of Kerala. This theater art involves music, songs, dance, acting, dialogue, story and unique costumes. While songs and dance adhere to well established talas very similar to Indian classical dance forms, acting and dialogues are created spontaneously on stage depending on ability of artists. This combination of classical and folk elements makes yakshagana unique from any other Indian art. This would be considered to be a form of opera in western eyes. Traditionally, yakshaganas use to start late in the night and run entire night. Bagavatha, the background singer is also the directory of the story and controls the entire proceedings on stage. Bagavatha along with background musicians who play chande and maddale forms himmela. The actors who wear colorful costumes and enact various roles in the story forms mummela. There are many professional troops in Karnataka. In spite of competition from modern movie industry and TV, these troops are arranging ticketed shows and making profit. Apart from this individuals arrange shows in their village inviting well known professional artists like Sri Chittani Ramachandra Hegde, Kondadakuli Ramachandra Hegde, Gopal Achari Theerthahalli and Ramesh Bhandari Murur, providing an opportunity for local talents to act with legends. Yakshagana is sometimes simply called as aataā in both Kannada and Khela (Karwari Konkani) Konkani (meaning play). Yaksha-gana literally means the song (gana) of a yaksha. Yakshas were an exotic tribe mentioned in the Sanskrit literature of ancient India. The Nawayath men wears lungis unique to them.

Literature

The literary field is represented by Karki Venkataramanasastri Suri, GR Pandeshwar, Gaurisha Kaikini, Yashwant Chittala, B.H. Sridhara, Shantinath Desai, Surankamundi, Arvind Nadakarni, CP Gangawkar, Krishnananda Kamath, PC Bhatt, Sundara Nadakarni, VG Bhatta, Dinakara Desai, VG Shahnag, Sham.. Krishna Raya, Gangadhar Chitta, GG Hegde, GS Bhatta, Jayantha Kaikini, Niranjana Vanalli, Rajeeva Ajjibala, Vishnu Naik, Shantaram Nayak Hichakada, Ramakrishna Gundi have been enriched. Many new poets and authors are promising. Newspapers in this district include Havayaka Subodha (1885), Karvara Chandrika (1885), Children's Newspaper Hitopadesh (1888), Saraswati (1900) and Vinodini (1904). First published in 1919 by Kumata from Kanada Dhurina (1922) and Nandini (1925) by Gokarna. Surrender Message (1931), Navachethana (1941), Device (1949) were published from Honnavar. Malayawani (1955) Annual Newspaper. In 1956, Bhama Masa was published by Shirazi. In 1957, Sirisena was...

Cuisine

Uttara Kannada is famous for a variety of seafood delicacies. Fish curry and rice is the staple diet of the locals. Cashews and coconut are also extensively used.

The staple diet includes a portion of steamed rice with a vegetable and/or seafood accompaniment. Seafood is immensely popular due to its ease of availability, and is prepared with a lot of local spices. Tea is the most popular beverage and is sometimes supplemented with cardamom or mint to give a distinct flavour.
 Kotte Kadubu: The main ingredients in Kotte Kadubu are jackfruit pulp and jaggery. The batter which is prepared with additional ingredients is put into a container and steamed. This dessert is a local delicacy and is served hot with ghee.
 Holge: These are similar to the sweet equivalents of tortillas. One variant is made with gram flour and jaggery, while the other is made with coconuts.
 Todadevu is a special kind of thin-crust dosa made out of jaggery or sugarcane juice. (Most local desserts of Sirsi have jaggery rather than sugar.)
 Shira: is rice cooked in sugar, ghee, and semolina.
 Karakali: is a special kind of spicy chutney prepared from colocasia leaves.
 Kotte Roti: A form of idli-like preparation, steam cooked in a conical shaped container constructed using jackfruit leaves.
 Patrode : a special dish prepared by steaming stuffed colocasia leaves.
 Neer Dose: A soft thin pancake made of batter of boiled rice, coconut milk and salt.
 Kajmiji
 Koli Kajjaya and Hosagere Kajjaya are made of rice flour and fried in oil is a famous dish often using roti. Often served with thick potato sambar or Nati chicken curry, it is a delicacy among the non-vegetarian communities in Siddapura.
 Banana Buns
 Hanchina Rotti
 Ankola Koli Saaru
 Appe Huli
 Patholi
 Kalali Masala
 Genasle
 Tambli

Transport

Public transport
North West Karnataka Transport Corporation (NWKRTC) is the state transport agency in the district. The NWKRTC covers all towns & villages of the district. There is a good network of public transport which connects the villages to the towns of the district. There are regular intra state services to major cities & towns of the state like Bangalore, Mangalore, Shimoga, Mysore, Hubli-Dharwad & Belgaum. The Kadama Transport buses of neighboring Goa state provides regular service from Karwar to Mangalore and all part of Goa state. Kumta, Bhatkal and Sirsi are the main hubs for public transport which provides services to intra-district & intrastate round the clock.

Many private transport buses also provide services for inter / intra state from the district. Bhatkal is the main sector for private transport in the district. The NH-66 which passes through the district which connects Panvel near Mumbai to Kerala state, many private buses are plying on this Highway which provides inter-intra state services to places like Bombay, Poona, Kolhapore, Belgaum, Panaji, Margao, Udupi, Mangalore, Bangalore, Mysore, Bhatkal, Kasaragod, Cannanore, Calicut etc.

Railways
The following Railways pass through the district:
 Konkan Railway which connects Mangalore and Mumbai via Kumta, Bhatkal, Karwar, Ratnagiri and Panvel.
 Londa to 'Vasco Railway line which passes through Castle Rock
 Castle rock to Dandeli Railway line.
 Hubli -Ankola railway line is proposed to link Karwar port and the northern Karnataka.
 Honnavar -Talaguppa, Shimoga railway line is proposed to link Karwar port and the central part of Karnataka.
 Sirsi -Haveri railway line is proposed to link Malnad region. 
Sirsi- Siddapur-Talaguppa, Shimoga railway line is proposed to link Shimoga. 
 RO-RO (Roll on/Roll off) services is provided by Konkan Railway to / from Ankola railway station to Suratkal Railway station. Many truckers use this facility between Ankola to Mangalore.

Ports
Uttara Kannada being one of the coastal district of the Karnataka state has a coast of  has many ports which are used for sea trade, naval base, fishing and other maritime activities.
 Karwar Port is an intermediate sea port the main activities of this port are berthing of ocean going ships, coastal shipping, and fishing jetty. Ship bunkering facility is also available at Karwar port.
 Karwar Airport will be built by the Indian Navy at Alageri village. Naval air base which is part of the Navy's Rs 10,000 crore Phase 2 of Project Seabird
 INS Kadamba is a naval base at Arga village of Karwar which is used exclusively for berthing of naval vessels. A naval ship repair yard (dry docks) is also attached to it.
 Belkeri Port is an anchorage port.
 Tadri Port is a fishing port.
 Kumta Port is a fishing port.
 Honnavar Port is a fishing port.
 Bhatkal Port is a fishing port. It was actually Project Seabird which is now in Karwar, people protest and proposal for withdrawn. There is another fishing port called Tengingundy Port.

The Proposed Hubli-Ankola railway line can be feasible venture for the future developments of the ports in the district, for movement of the cargo, at present roads are only major mode of cargo movement which leads to congestion of the National Highways of the district.

Nearby airports
 Goa International Airport
 Mangalore International Airport
 Hubli Airport
 Belgaum Airport

Tourist places
Uttara Kannada (North Kanara) has many tourist places which cater to different likes of the people. There are many religious places like Gokarna, Murudeshwar, Idagunji and Ulavi. The district (Jilla) has many beaches at Karwar, Gokarna, Bhavikeri near Ankola, Murdeshwar, Harawada, Kadle beach near Kumta, Handigon. Anshi National Park (Kali Tiger Reserve) is located in Uttara Kannada Jille. The backwaters of dams built across river Kali at Kadra, Thattihalla, Kodasalli, Supa and Bommanahalli provide splendid views in rainy season. There are many waterfalls in Uttar Kannada district Sathodi, Devkar, Emme shirle, Arebail, Benne Hole, U nchalli, Burude, Balepatte to name a few.

Notable personalities
 Justice Dr. S. R. Nayak, Chief Justice of Karnataka High Court
 Ramakrishna Hegde, two term Chief Minister of Karnataka
 S. M. Yahya, former Finance Minister of Karnataka
 Dr. Sannappa Parameshwar Gaonkar, Deputy Chief Minister in B. G. Kher's Cabinet of the State of Bombay
 Venkanna H. Nayak, barrister, Former Commissioner of Bijapur District, and a Deputy Commissioner of Dharwar District.
 Dr. N. K. Nayak, Professor Emeritus at IIT Bombay
 Anant Nag, actor
 Shankar Nag, actor and director
 Yashwant Chittal
 Shantinath Desai
 Chittani Ramachandra Hegde, Yakshagana artist
 Gurudas Kamat, politician
 Major Rama Raghoba Rane, Param Veer Chakra Awardee
 Jayshree Gadkar, Marathi movie actress
 Dinakara Desai
 Gourish Kaikini, author and teacher
 Narayan Hosmane
 Jayant Kaikini
 Leena Chandavarkar, actress
 Nandan Nilekani, businessman
 Pandari Bai, actress
 Sundar Nadkarni
 Vilas Sarang
 Keremane Shivarama Hegde, Yakshagana artist
 Mynavathi, Kannada Actress
 R N Shetty, industrialist
 Anuradha Paudwal, singer
 Radhika Pandit, actress

References

External links

 

Districts of Karnataka
Uttara Kannada district
Belgaum division